In physics, electromagnetic radiation (EMR) consists of waves of the electromagnetic (EM) field, which propagate through space and carry momentum and electromagnetic radiant energy. It includes radio waves, microwaves, infrared, (visible) light, ultraviolet, X-rays, and gamma rays. All of these waves form part of the electromagnetic spectrum.

Classically, electromagnetic radiation consists of electromagnetic waves, which are synchronized oscillations of electric and magnetic fields.  Depending on the frequency of oscillation, different wavelengths of electromagnetic spectrum are produced. In a vacuum, electromagnetic waves travel at the speed of light, commonly denoted c. In homogeneous, isotropic media, the oscillations of the two fields are perpendicular to each other and perpendicular to the direction of energy and wave propagation, forming a transverse wave. The position of an electromagnetic wave within the electromagnetic spectrum can be characterized by either its frequency of oscillation or its wavelength.  Electromagnetic waves of different frequency are called by different names since they have different sources and effects on matter.  In order of increasing frequency and decreasing wavelength these are: radio waves, microwaves, infrared radiation, visible light, ultraviolet radiation, X-rays and gamma rays.

Electromagnetic waves are emitted by electrically charged particles undergoing acceleration, and these waves can subsequently interact with other charged particles, exerting force on them.  EM waves carry energy, momentum and angular momentum away from their source particle and can impart those quantities to matter with which they interact.  Electromagnetic radiation is associated with those EM waves that are free to propagate themselves ("radiate") without the continuing influence of the moving charges that produced them, because they have achieved sufficient distance from those charges. Thus, EMR is sometimes referred to as the far field. In this language, the near field refers to EM fields near the charges and current that directly produced them, specifically electromagnetic induction and electrostatic induction phenomena.

In quantum mechanics, an alternate way of viewing EMR is that it consists of photons, uncharged elementary particles with zero rest mass which are the quanta of the electromagnetic field, responsible for all electromagnetic interactions. Quantum electrodynamics is the theory of how EMR interacts with matter on an atomic level. Quantum effects provide additional sources of EMR, such as the transition of electrons to lower energy levels in an atom and black-body radiation. The energy of an individual photon is quantized and is greater for photons of higher frequency. This relationship is given by Planck's equation E = hf, where E is the energy per photon, f is the frequency of the photon, and h is Planck's constant. A single gamma ray photon, for example, might carry ~100,000 times the energy of a single photon of visible light.

The effects of EMR upon chemical compounds and biological organisms depend both upon the radiation's power and its frequency. EMR of visible or lower frequencies (i.e., visible light, infrared, microwaves, and radio waves) is called non-ionizing radiation, because its photons do not individually have enough energy to ionize atoms or molecules, or break chemical bonds. The effects of these radiations on chemical systems and living tissue are caused primarily by heating effects from the combined energy transfer of many photons. In contrast, high frequency ultraviolet, X-rays and gamma rays are called ionizing radiation, since individual photons of such high frequency have enough energy to ionize molecules or break chemical bonds. These radiations have the ability to cause chemical reactions and damage living cells beyond that resulting from simple heating, and can be a health hazard.

Physics

Theory

Maxwell's equations 
James Clerk Maxwell derived a wave form of the electric and magnetic equations, thus uncovering the wave-like nature of electric and magnetic fields and their symmetry. Because the speed of EM waves predicted by the wave equation coincided with the measured speed of light, Maxwell concluded that light itself is an EM wave. Maxwell's equations were confirmed by Heinrich Hertz through experiments with radio waves.

 Maxwell realized that since a lot of physics is symmetrical and mathematically artistic in a way, that there must also be a symmetry between electricity and magnetism. He realized that light is a combination of electricity and magnetism and thus that the two must be tied together. According to Maxwell's equations, a spatially varying electric field is always associated with a magnetic field that changes over time. Likewise, a spatially varying magnetic field is associated with specific changes over time in the electric field. In an electromagnetic wave, the changes in the electric field are always accompanied by a wave in the magnetic field in one direction, and vice versa. This relationship between the two occurs without either type of field causing the other; rather, they occur together in the same way that time and space changes occur together and are interlinked in special relativity. In fact, magnetic fields can be viewed as electric fields in another frame of reference, and electric fields can be viewed as magnetic fields in another frame of reference, but they have equal significance as physics is the same in all frames of reference, so the close relationship between space and time changes here is more than an analogy. Together, these fields form a propagating electromagnetic wave, which moves out into space and need never again interact with the source. The distant EM field formed in this way by the acceleration of a charge carries energy with it that "radiates" away through space, hence the term.

Near and far fields 

Maxwell's equations established that some charges and currents ("sources") produce a local type of electromagnetic field near them that does not have the behaviour of EMR. Currents directly produce a magnetic field, but it is of a magnetic dipole type that dies out with distance from the current. In a similar manner, moving charges pushed apart in a conductor by a changing electrical potential (such as in an antenna) produce an electric dipole type electrical field, but this also declines with distance. These fields make up the near-field near the EMR source. Neither of these behaviours are responsible for EM radiation. Instead, they cause electromagnetic field behaviour that only efficiently transfers power to a receiver very close to the source, such as the magnetic induction inside a transformer, or the feedback behaviour that happens close to the coil of a metal detector. Typically, near-fields have a powerful effect on their own sources, causing an increased "load" (decreased electrical reactance) in the source or transmitter, whenever energy is withdrawn from the EM field by a receiver. Otherwise, these fields do not "propagate" freely out into space, carrying their energy away without distance-limit, but rather oscillate, returning their energy to the transmitter if it is not received by a receiver.

By contrast, the EM far-field is composed of radiation that is free of the transmitter in the sense that (unlike the case in an electrical transformer) the transmitter requires the same power to send these changes in the fields out, whether the signal is immediately picked up or not. This distant part of the electromagnetic field is "electromagnetic radiation" (also called the far-field). The far-fields propagate (radiate) without allowing the transmitter to affect them. This causes them to be independent in the sense that their existence and their energy, after they have left the transmitter, is completely independent of both transmitter and receiver. Due to conservation of energy, the amount of power passing through any spherical surface drawn around the source is the same. Because such a surface has an area proportional to the square of its distance from the source, the power density of EM radiation always decreases with the inverse square of the distance from the source; this is called the inverse-square law. This is in contrast to dipole parts of the EM field close to the source (the near-field), which vary in power according to an inverse cube power law, and thus do not transport a conserved amount of energy over distances, but instead fade with distance, with its energy (as noted) rapidly returning to the transmitter or absorbed by a nearby receiver (such as a transformer secondary coil).

The far-field (EMR) depends on a different mechanism for its production than the near-field, and upon different terms in Maxwell's equations. Whereas the magnetic part of the near-field is due to currents in the source, the magnetic field in EMR is due only to the local change in the electric field. In a similar way, while the electric field in the near-field is due directly to the charges and charge-separation in the source, the electric field in EMR is due to a change in the local magnetic field. Both processes for producing electric and magnetic EMR fields have a different dependence on distance than do near-field dipole electric and magnetic fields. That is why the EMR type of EM field becomes dominant in power "far" from sources. The term "far from sources" refers to how far from the source (moving at the speed of light) any portion of the outward-moving EM field is located, by the time that source currents are changed by the varying source potential, and the source has therefore begun to generate an outwardly moving EM field of a different phase.

A more compact view of EMR is that the far-field that composes EMR is generally that part of the EM field that has traveled sufficient distance from the source, that it has become completely disconnected from any feedback to the charges and currents that were originally responsible for it. Now independent of the source charges, the EM field, as it moves farther away, is dependent only upon the accelerations of the charges that produced it. It no longer has a strong connection to the direct fields of the charges, or to the velocity of the charges (currents).

In the Liénard–Wiechert potential formulation of the electric and magnetic fields due to motion of a single particle (according to Maxwell's equations), the terms associated with acceleration of the particle are those that are responsible for the part of the field that is regarded as electromagnetic radiation. By contrast, the term associated with the changing static electric field of the particle and the magnetic term that results from the particle's uniform velocity, are both associated with the electromagnetic near-field, and do not comprise EM radiation.

Properties 

Electrodynamics is the physics of electromagnetic radiation, and electromagnetism is the physical phenomenon associated with the theory of electrodynamics. Electric and magnetic fields obey the properties of superposition. Thus, a field due to any particular particle or time-varying electric or magnetic field contributes to the fields present in the same space due to other causes. Further, as they are vector fields, all magnetic and electric field vectors add together according to vector addition. For example, in optics two or more coherent light waves may interact and by constructive or destructive interference yield a resultant irradiance deviating from the sum of the component irradiances of the individual light waves.

The electromagnetic fields of light are not affected by traveling through static electric or magnetic fields in a linear medium such as a vacuum. However, in nonlinear media, such as some crystals, interactions can occur between light and static electric and magnetic fields—these interactions include the Faraday effect and the Kerr effect.

In refraction, a wave crossing from one medium to another of different density alters its speed and direction upon entering the new medium. The ratio of the refractive indices of the media determines the degree of refraction, and is summarized by Snell's law. Light of composite wavelengths (natural sunlight) disperses into a visible spectrum passing through a prism, because of the wavelength-dependent refractive index of the prism material (dispersion); that is, each component wave within the composite light is bent a different amount.

EM radiation exhibits both wave properties and particle properties at the same time (see wave-particle duality). Both wave and particle characteristics have been confirmed in many experiments. Wave characteristics are more apparent when EM radiation is measured over relatively large timescales and over large distances while particle characteristics are more evident when measuring small timescales and distances. For example, when electromagnetic radiation is absorbed by matter, particle-like properties will be more obvious when the average number of photons in the cube of the relevant wavelength is much smaller than 1. It is not so difficult to experimentally observe non-uniform deposition of energy when light is absorbed, however this alone is not evidence of "particulate" behavior. Rather, it reflects the quantum nature of matter. Demonstrating that the light itself is quantized, not merely its interaction with matter, is a more subtle affair.

Some experiments display both the wave and particle natures of electromagnetic waves, such as the self-interference of a single photon. When a single photon is sent through an interferometer, it passes through both paths, interfering with itself, as waves do, yet is detected by a photomultiplier or other sensitive detector only once.

A quantum theory of the interaction between electromagnetic radiation and matter such as electrons is described by the theory of quantum electrodynamics.

Electromagnetic waves can be polarized, reflected, refracted, diffracted or interfere with each other.

Wave model 

 In homogeneous, isotropic media, electromagnetic radiation is a transverse wave, meaning that its oscillations are perpendicular to the direction of energy transfer and travel. It comes from the following equations:These equations predicate that any electromagnetic wave must be a transverse wave, where the electric field  and the magnetic field  are both perpendicular to the direction of wave propagation.

The electric and magnetic parts of the field in an electromagnetic wave stand in a fixed ratio of strengths to satisfy the two Maxwell equations that specify how one is produced from the other. In dissipation-less (lossless) media, these E and B fields are also in phase, with both reaching maxima and minima at the same points in space (see illustrations). A common misconception is that the E and B fields in electromagnetic radiation are out of phase because a change in one produces the other, and this would produce a phase difference between them as sinusoidal functions (as indeed happens in electromagnetic induction, and in the near-field close to antennas). However, in the far-field EM radiation which is described by the two source-free Maxwell curl operator equations, a more correct description is that a time-change in one type of field is proportional to a space-change in the other. These derivatives require that the E and B fields in EMR are in-phase (see mathematics section below).

An important aspect of light's nature is its frequency. The frequency of a wave is its rate of oscillation and is measured in hertz, the SI unit of frequency, where one hertz is equal to one oscillation per second. Light usually has multiple frequencies that sum to form the resultant wave. Different frequencies undergo different angles of refraction, a phenomenon known as dispersion.

A monochromatic wave (a wave of a single frequency) consists of successive troughs and crests, and the distance between two adjacent crests or troughs is called the wavelength. Waves of the electromagnetic spectrum vary in size, from very long radio waves longer than a continent to very short gamma rays smaller than atom nuclei. Frequency is inversely proportional to wavelength, according to the equation:

where v is the speed of the wave (c in a vacuum or less in other media), f is the frequency and λ is the wavelength. As waves cross boundaries between different media, their speeds change but their frequencies remain constant.

Electromagnetic waves in free space must be solutions of Maxwell's electromagnetic wave equation. Two main classes of solutions are known, namely plane waves and spherical waves. The plane waves may be viewed as the limiting case of spherical waves at a very large (ideally infinite) distance from the source.  Both types of waves can have a waveform which is an arbitrary time function (so long as it is sufficiently differentiable to conform to the wave equation).  As with any time function, this can be decomposed by means of Fourier analysis into its frequency spectrum, or individual sinusoidal components, each of which contains a single frequency, amplitude and phase. Such a component wave is said to be monochromatic.  A monochromatic electromagnetic wave can be characterized by its frequency or wavelength, its peak amplitude, its phase relative to some reference phase, its direction of propagation, and its polarization.

Interference is the superposition of two or more waves resulting in a new wave pattern. If the fields have components in the same direction, they constructively interfere, while opposite directions cause destructive interference. An example of interference caused by EMR is electromagnetic interference (EMI) or as it is more commonly known as, radio-frequency interference (RFI).  Additionally, multiple polarization signals can be combined (i.e. interfered) to form new states of polarization, which is known as parallel polarization state generation.

The energy in electromagnetic waves is sometimes called radiant energy.

Particle model and quantum theory 

An anomaly arose in the late 19th century involving a contradiction between the wave theory of light and measurements of the electromagnetic spectra that were being emitted by thermal radiators known as black bodies. Physicists struggled with this problem unsuccessfully for many years. It later became known as the ultraviolet catastrophe. In 1900, Max Planck developed a new theory of black-body radiation that explained the observed spectrum. Planck's theory was based on the idea that black bodies emit light (and other electromagnetic radiation) only as discrete bundles or packets of energy. These packets were called quanta. In 1905, Albert Einstein proposed that light quanta be regarded as real particles. Later the particle of light was given the name photon, to correspond with other particles being described around this time, such as the electron and proton. A photon has an energy, E, proportional to its frequency, f, by

 

where h is Planck's constant,  is the wavelength and c is the speed of light. This is sometimes known as the Planck–Einstein equation. In quantum theory (see first quantization) the energy of the photons is thus directly proportional to the frequency of the EMR wave.

Likewise, the momentum p of a photon is also proportional to its frequency and inversely proportional to its wavelength:

 

The source of Einstein's proposal that light was composed of particles (or could act as particles in some circumstances) was an experimental anomaly not explained by the wave theory: the photoelectric effect, in which light striking a metal surface ejected electrons from the surface, causing an electric current to flow across an applied voltage. Experimental measurements demonstrated that the energy of individual ejected electrons was proportional to the frequency, rather than the intensity, of the light. Furthermore, below a certain minimum frequency, which depended on the particular metal, no current would flow regardless of the intensity. These observations appeared to contradict the wave theory, and for years physicists tried in vain to find an explanation. In 1905, Einstein explained this puzzle by resurrecting the particle theory of light to explain the observed effect. Because of the preponderance of evidence in favor of the wave theory, however, Einstein's ideas were met initially with great skepticism among established physicists. Eventually Einstein's explanation was accepted as new particle-like behavior of light was observed, such as the Compton effect.

As a photon is absorbed by an atom, it excites the atom, elevating an electron to a higher energy level (one that is on average farther from the nucleus). When an electron in an excited molecule or atom descends to a lower energy level, it emits a photon of light at a frequency corresponding to the energy difference. Since the energy levels of electrons in atoms are discrete, each element and each molecule emits and absorbs its own characteristic frequencies. Immediate photon emission is called fluorescence, a type of photoluminescence. An example is visible light emitted from fluorescent paints, in response to ultraviolet (blacklight). Many other fluorescent emissions are known in spectral bands other than visible light. Delayed emission is called phosphorescence.

Wave–particle duality 

The modern theory that explains the nature of light includes the notion of wave–particle duality. More generally, the theory states that everything has both a particle nature and a wave nature, and various experiments can be done to bring out one or the other. The particle nature is more easily discerned using an object with a large mass. A bold proposition by Louis de Broglie in 1924 led the scientific community to realize that matter (e.g. electrons) also exhibits wave–particle duality.

Wave and particle effects of electromagnetic radiation 
Together, wave and particle effects fully explain the emission and absorption spectra of EM radiation. The matter-composition of the medium through which the light travels determines the nature of the absorption and emission spectrum. These bands correspond to the allowed energy levels in the atoms. Dark bands in the absorption spectrum are due to the atoms in an intervening medium between source and observer. The atoms absorb certain frequencies of the light between emitter and detector/eye, then emit them in all directions. A dark band appears to the detector, due to the radiation scattered out of the beam. For instance, dark bands in the light emitted by a distant star are due to the atoms in the star's atmosphere. A similar phenomenon occurs for emission, which is seen when an emitting gas glows due to excitation of the atoms from any mechanism, including heat. As electrons descend to lower energy levels, a spectrum is emitted that represents the jumps between the energy levels of the electrons, but lines are seen because again emission happens only at particular energies after excitation. An example is the emission spectrum of nebulae. Rapidly moving electrons are most sharply accelerated when they encounter a region of force, so they are responsible for producing much of the highest frequency electromagnetic radiation observed in nature.

These phenomena can aid various chemical determinations for the composition of gases lit from behind (absorption spectra) and for glowing gases (emission spectra). Spectroscopy (for example) determines what chemical elements comprise a particular star. Spectroscopy is also used in the determination of the distance of a star, using the red shift.

Propagation speed 

When any wire (or other conducting object such as an antenna) conducts alternating current, electromagnetic radiation is propagated at the same frequency as the current. In many such situations it is possible to identify an electrical dipole moment that arises from separation of charges due to the exciting electrical potential, and this dipole moment oscillates in time, as the charges move back and forth. This oscillation at a given frequency gives rise to changing electric and magnetic fields, which then set the electromagnetic radiation in motion.

At the quantum level, electromagnetic radiation is produced when the wavepacket of a charged particle oscillates or otherwise accelerates. Charged particles in a stationary state do not move, but a superposition of such states may result in a transition state that has an electric dipole moment that oscillates in time. This oscillating dipole moment is responsible for the phenomenon of radiative transition between quantum states of a charged particle. Such states occur (for example) in atoms when photons are radiated as the atom shifts from one stationary state to another.

As a wave, light is characterized by a velocity (the speed of light), wavelength, and frequency. As particles, light is a stream of photons. Each has an energy related to the frequency of the wave given by Planck's relation E = hf, where E is the energy of the photon, h is Planck's constant, 6.626 × 10−34 J·s, and f is the frequency of the wave.

One rule is obeyed regardless of circumstances: EM radiation in a vacuum travels at the speed of light, relative to the observer, regardless of the observer's velocity. 
In a medium (other than vacuum), velocity factor or refractive index are considered, depending on frequency and application. Both of these are ratios of the speed in a medium to speed in a vacuum.

Special theory of relativity 

By the late nineteenth century, various experimental anomalies could not be explained by the simple wave theory. One of these anomalies involved a controversy over the speed of light. The speed of light and other EMR predicted by Maxwell's equations did not appear unless the equations were modified in a way first suggested by FitzGerald and Lorentz (see history of special relativity), or else otherwise that speed would depend on the speed of observer relative to the "medium" (called luminiferous aether) which supposedly "carried" the electromagnetic wave (in a manner analogous to the way air carries sound waves). Experiments failed to find any observer effect. In 1905, Einstein proposed that space and time appeared to be velocity-changeable entities for light propagation and all other processes and laws. These changes accounted for the constancy of the speed of light and all electromagnetic radiation, from the viewpoints of all observers—even those in relative motion.

History of discovery 

Electromagnetic radiation of wavelengths other than those of visible light were discovered in the early 19th century. The discovery of infrared radiation is ascribed to astronomer William Herschel, who published his results in 1800 before the Royal Society of London. Herschel used a glass prism to refract light from the Sun and detected invisible rays that caused heating beyond the red part of the spectrum, through an increase in the temperature recorded with a thermometer. These "calorific rays" were later termed infrared.

In 1801, German physicist Johann Wilhelm Ritter discovered ultraviolet in an experiment similar to Herschel's, using sunlight and a glass prism. Ritter noted that invisible rays near the violet edge of a solar spectrum dispersed by a triangular prism darkened silver chloride preparations more quickly than did the nearby violet light. Ritter's experiments were an early precursor to what would become photography. Ritter noted that the ultraviolet rays (which at first were called "chemical rays") were capable of causing chemical reactions.

In 1862–64 James Clerk Maxwell developed equations for the electromagnetic field which suggested that waves in the field would travel with a speed that was very close to the known speed of light. Maxwell therefore suggested that visible light (as well as invisible infrared and ultraviolet rays by inference) all consisted of propagating disturbances (or radiation) in the electromagnetic field. Radio waves were first produced deliberately by Heinrich Hertz in 1887, using electrical circuits calculated to produce oscillations at a much lower frequency than that of visible light, following recipes for producing oscillating charges and currents suggested by Maxwell's equations. Hertz also developed ways to detect these waves, and produced and characterized what were later termed radio waves and microwaves.

Wilhelm Röntgen discovered and named X-rays. After experimenting with high voltages applied to an evacuated tube on 8 November 1895, he noticed a fluorescence on a nearby plate of coated glass. In one month, he discovered X-rays' main properties.

The last portion of the EM spectrum to be discovered was associated with radioactivity. Henri Becquerel found that uranium salts caused fogging of an unexposed photographic plate through a covering paper in a manner similar to X-rays, and Marie Curie discovered that only certain elements gave off these rays of energy, soon discovering the intense radiation of radium. The radiation from pitchblende was differentiated into alpha rays (alpha particles) and beta rays (beta particles) by Ernest Rutherford through simple experimentation in 1899, but these proved to be charged particulate types of radiation. However, in 1900 the French scientist Paul Villard discovered a third neutrally charged and especially penetrating type of radiation from radium, and after he described it, Rutherford realized it must be yet a third type of radiation, which in 1903 Rutherford named gamma rays. In 1910 British physicist William Henry Bragg demonstrated that gamma rays are electromagnetic radiation, not particles, and in 1914 Rutherford and Edward Andrade measured their wavelengths, finding that they were similar to X-rays but with shorter wavelengths and higher frequency, although a 'cross-over' between X and gamma rays makes it possible to have X-rays with a higher energy (and hence shorter wavelength) than gamma rays and vice versa. The origin of the ray differentiates them, gamma rays tend to be natural phenomena originating from the unstable nucleus of an atom and X-rays are electrically generated (and hence man-made) unless they are as a result of bremsstrahlung X-radiation caused by the interaction of fast moving particles (such as beta particles) colliding with certain materials, usually of higher atomic numbers.

Electromagnetic spectrum 

EM radiation (the designation 'radiation' excludes static electric and magnetic and near fields) is classified by wavelength into radio, microwave, infrared, visible, ultraviolet, X-rays and gamma rays. Arbitrary electromagnetic waves can be expressed by Fourier analysis in terms of sinusoidal monochromatic waves, which in turn can each be classified into these regions of the EMR spectrum.

For certain classes of EM waves, the waveform is most usefully treated as random, and then spectral analysis must be done by slightly different mathematical techniques appropriate to random or stochastic processes. In such cases, the individual frequency components are represented in terms of their power content, and the phase information is not preserved. Such a representation is called the power spectral density of the random process. Random electromagnetic radiation requiring this kind of analysis is, for example, encountered in the interior of stars, and in certain other very wideband forms of radiation such as the Zero point wave field of the electromagnetic vacuum.

The behavior of EM radiation and its interaction with matter depends on its frequency, and changes qualitatively as the frequency changes. Lower frequencies have longer wavelengths, and higher frequencies have shorter wavelengths, and are associated with photons of higher energy. There is no fundamental limit known to these wavelengths or energies, at either end of the spectrum, although photons with energies near the Planck energy or exceeding it (far too high to have ever been observed) will require new physical theories to describe.

Radio and microwave 

When radio waves impinge upon a conductor, they couple to the conductor, travel along it and induce an electric current on the conductor surface by moving the electrons of the conducting material in correlated bunches of charge. Such effects can cover macroscopic distances in conductors (such as radio antennas), since the wavelength of radiowaves is long.

Electromagnetic radiation phenomena with wavelengths ranging from as long as one meter to as short as one millimeter are called microwaves; with frequencies between 300 MHz (0.3 GHz) and 300 GHz.

At radio and microwave frequencies, EMR interacts with matter largely as a bulk collection of charges which are spread out over large numbers of affected atoms. In electrical conductors, such induced bulk movement of charges (electric currents) results in absorption of the EMR, or else separations of charges that cause generation of new EMR (effective reflection of the EMR). An example is absorption or emission of radio waves by antennas, or absorption of microwaves by water or other molecules with an electric dipole moment, as for example inside a microwave oven. These interactions produce either electric currents or heat, or both.

Infrared 

Like radio and microwave, infrared (IR) also is reflected by metals (and also most EMR, well into the ultraviolet range). However, unlike lower-frequency radio and microwave radiation, Infrared EMR commonly interacts with dipoles present in single molecules, which change as atoms vibrate at the ends of a single chemical bond. It is consequently absorbed by a wide range of substances, causing them to increase in temperature as the vibrations dissipate as heat. The same process, run in reverse, causes bulk substances to radiate in the infrared spontaneously (see thermal radiation section below).

Infrared radiation is divided into spectral subregions. While different subdivision schemes exist, the spectrum is commonly divided as near-infrared (0.75–1.4 μm), short-wavelength infrared (1.4–3 μm), mid-wavelength infrared (3–8 μm), long-wavelength infrared (8–15 μm) and far infrared (15–1000 μm).

Visible light 

Natural sources produce EM radiation across the spectrum. EM radiation with a wavelength between approximately 400 nm and 700 nm is directly detected by the human eye and perceived as visible light. Other wavelengths, especially nearby infrared (longer than 700 nm) and ultraviolet (shorter than 400 nm) are also sometimes referred to as light.

As frequency increases into the visible range, photons have enough energy to change the bond structure of some individual molecules. It is not a coincidence that this happens in the visible range, as the mechanism of vision involves the change in bonding of a single molecule, retinal, which absorbs a single photon. The change in retinal causes a change in the shape of the rhodopsin protein it is contained in, which starts the biochemical process that causes the retina of the human eye to sense the light.

Photosynthesis becomes possible in this range as well, for the same reason. A single molecule of chlorophyll is excited by a single photon. In plant tissues that conduct photosynthesis, carotenoids act to quench electronically excited chlorophyll produced by visible light in a process called non-photochemical quenching, to prevent reactions that would otherwise interfere with photosynthesis at high light levels.

Animals that detect infrared make use of small packets of water that change temperature, in an essentially thermal process that involves many photons.

Infrared, microwaves and radio waves are known to damage molecules and biological tissue only by bulk heating, not excitation from single photons of the radiation.

Visible light is able to affect only a tiny percentage of all molecules. Usually not in a permanent or damaging way, rather the photon excites an electron which then emits another photon when returning to its original position. This is the source of color produced by most dyes. Retinal is an exception. When a photon is absorbed, the retinal permanently changes structure from cis to trans, and requires a protein to convert it back, i.e. reset it to be able to function as a light detector again.

Limited evidence indicate that some reactive oxygen species are created by visible light in skin, and that these may have some role in photoaging, in the same manner as ultraviolet A.

Ultraviolet 

As frequency increases into the ultraviolet, photons now carry enough energy (about three electron volts or more) to excite certain doubly bonded molecules into permanent chemical rearrangement. In DNA, this causes lasting damage. DNA is also indirectly damaged by reactive oxygen species produced by ultraviolet A (UVA), which has energy too low to damage DNA directly. This is why ultraviolet at all wavelengths can damage DNA, and is capable of causing cancer, and (for UVB) skin burns (sunburn) that are far worse than would be produced by simple heating (temperature increase) effects. This property of causing molecular damage that is out of proportion to heating effects, is characteristic of all EMR with frequencies at the visible light range and above. These properties of high-frequency EMR are due to quantum effects that permanently damage materials and tissues at the molecular level.

At the higher end of the ultraviolet range, the energy of photons becomes large enough to impart enough energy to electrons to cause them to be liberated from the atom, in a process called photoionisation. The energy required for this is always larger than about 10 electron volt (eV) corresponding with wavelengths smaller than 124 nm (some sources suggest a more realistic cutoff of 33 eV, which is the energy required to ionize water). This high end of the ultraviolet spectrum with energies in the approximate ionization range, is sometimes called "extreme UV." Ionizing UV is strongly filtered by the Earth's atmosphere.

X-rays and gamma rays 

Electromagnetic radiation composed of photons that carry minimum-ionization energy, or more, (which includes the entire spectrum with shorter wavelengths), is therefore termed ionizing radiation. (Many other kinds of ionizing radiation are made of non-EM particles). Electromagnetic-type ionizing radiation extends from the extreme ultraviolet to all higher frequencies and shorter wavelengths, which means that all X-rays and gamma rays qualify. These are capable of the most severe types of molecular damage, which can happen in biology to any type of biomolecule, including mutation and cancer, and often at great depths below the skin, since the higher end of the X-ray spectrum, and all of the gamma ray spectrum, penetrate matter.

Atmosphere and magnetosphere 

Most UV and X-rays are blocked by absorption first from molecular nitrogen, and then (for wavelengths in the upper UV) from the electronic excitation of dioxygen and finally ozone at the mid-range of UV. Only 30% of the Sun's ultraviolet light reaches the ground, and almost all of this is well transmitted.

Visible light is well transmitted in air, as it is not energetic enough to excite nitrogen, oxygen, or ozone, but too energetic to excite molecular vibrational frequencies of water vapor.

Absorption bands in the infrared are due to modes of vibrational excitation in water vapor. However, at energies too low to excite water vapor, the atmosphere becomes transparent again, allowing free transmission of most microwave and radio waves. 

Finally, at radio wavelengths longer than 10 m or so (about 30 MHz), the air in the lower atmosphere remains transparent to radio, but plasma in certain layers of the ionosphere begins to interact with radio waves (see skywave). This property allows some longer wavelengths (100 m or 3 MHz) to be reflected and results in shortwave radio beyond line-of-sight. However, certain  ionospheric effects begin to block incoming radiowaves from space, when their frequency is less than about 10 MHz (wavelength longer than about 30 m).

Thermal and electromagnetic radiation as a form of heat 

The basic structure of matter involves charged particles bound together. When electromagnetic radiation impinges on matter, it causes the charged particles to oscillate and gain energy. The ultimate fate of this energy depends on the context. It could be immediately re-radiated and appear as scattered, reflected, or transmitted radiation. It may get dissipated into other microscopic motions within the matter, coming to thermal equilibrium and manifesting itself as thermal energy, or even kinetic energy, in the material. With a few exceptions related to high-energy photons (such as fluorescence, harmonic generation, photochemical reactions, the photovoltaic effect for ionizing radiations at far ultraviolet, X-ray and gamma radiation), absorbed electromagnetic radiation simply deposits its energy by heating the material. This happens for infrared, microwave and radio wave radiation. Intense radio waves can thermally burn living tissue and can cook food. In addition to infrared lasers, sufficiently intense visible and ultraviolet lasers can easily set paper afire.

Ionizing radiation creates high-speed electrons in a material and breaks chemical bonds, but after these electrons collide many times with other atoms eventually most of the energy becomes thermal energy all in a tiny fraction of a second. This process makes ionizing radiation far more dangerous per unit of energy than non-ionizing radiation. This caveat also applies to UV, even though almost all of it is not ionizing, because UV can damage molecules due to electronic excitation, which is far greater per unit energy than heating effects.

Infrared radiation in the spectral distribution of a black body is usually considered a form of heat, since it has an equivalent temperature and is associated with an entropy change per unit of thermal energy. However, "heat" is a technical term in physics and thermodynamics and is often confused with thermal energy. Any type of electromagnetic energy can be transformed into thermal energy in interaction with matter. Thus, any electromagnetic radiation can "heat" (in the sense of increase the thermal energy temperature of) a material, when it is absorbed.

The inverse or time-reversed process of absorption is thermal radiation. Much of the thermal energy in matter consists of random motion of charged particles, and this energy can be radiated away from the matter. The resulting radiation may subsequently be absorbed by another piece of matter, with the deposited energy heating the material.

The electromagnetic radiation in an opaque cavity at thermal equilibrium is effectively a form of thermal energy, having maximum radiation entropy.

Biological effects 

Bioelectromagnetics is the study of the interactions and effects of EM radiation on living organisms. The effects of electromagnetic radiation upon living cells, including those in humans, depends upon the radiation's power and frequency. For low-frequency radiation (radio waves to visible light) the best-understood effects are those due to radiation power alone, acting through heating when radiation is absorbed. For these thermal effects, frequency is important as it affects the intensity of the radiation and penetration into the organism (for example, microwaves penetrate better than infrared). It is widely accepted that low frequency fields that are too weak to cause significant heating could not possibly have any biological effect.

Despite the commonly accepted results, some research has been conducted to show that weaker non-thermal electromagnetic fields (including weak ELF magnetic fields, although the latter does not strictly qualify as EM radiation) and modulated RF and microwave fields have biological effects. Fundamental mechanisms of the interaction between biological material and electromagnetic fields at non-thermal levels are not fully understood.

The World Health Organization has classified radio frequency electromagnetic radiation as Group 2B – possibly carcinogenic. This group contains possible carcinogens such as lead, DDT, and styrene. For example, epidemiological studies looking for a relationship between cell phone use and brain cancer development have been largely inconclusive, save to demonstrate that the effect, if it exists, cannot be a large one.

At higher frequencies (visible and beyond), the effects of individual photons begin to become important, as these now have enough energy individually to directly or indirectly damage biological molecules. All UV frequencies have been classed as Group 1 carcinogens by the World Health Organization. Ultraviolet radiation from sun exposure is the primary cause of skin cancer.

Thus, at UV frequencies and higher (and probably somewhat also in the visible range), electromagnetic radiation does more damage to biological systems than simple heating predicts. This is most obvious in the "far" (or "extreme") ultraviolet. UV, with X-ray and gamma radiation, are referred to as ionizing radiation due to the ability of photons of this radiation to produce ions and free radicals in materials (including living tissue). Since such radiation can severely damage life at energy levels that produce little heating, it is considered far more dangerous (in terms of damage-produced per unit of energy, or power) than the rest of the electromagnetic spectrum.

Use as weapon 

The heat ray is an application of EMR that makes use of microwave frequencies to create an unpleasant heating effect in the upper layer of the skin. A publicly known heat ray weapon called the Active Denial System was developed by the US military as an experimental weapon to deny the enemy access to an area. A death ray is a theoretical weapon that delivers heat ray based on electromagnetic energy at levels that are capable of injuring human tissue. An inventor of a death ray, Harry Grindell Matthews, claimed to have lost sight in his left eye while working on his death ray weapon based on a microwave magnetron from the 1920s (a normal microwave oven creates a tissue damaging cooking effect inside the oven at around 2 kV/m).

Derivation from electromagnetic theory 

Electromagnetic waves are predicted by the classical laws of electricity and magnetism, known as Maxwell's equations. There are nontrivial solutions of the homogeneous Maxwell's equations (without charges or currents), describing waves of changing electric and magnetic fields. Beginning with Maxwell's equations in free space:

where
  yields the divergence and  the curl of a vector field 

Besides the trivial solution

useful solutions can be derived with the following vector identity, valid for all vectors  in some vector field:

Taking the curl of the second Maxwell equation yields:

Combining and  again, gives a vector-valued differential equation for the electric field, solving the homogeneous Maxwell equations:

Taking the curl of the fourth Maxwell equation results in a similar differential equation for a magnetic field solving the homogeneous Maxwell equations:

Both differential equations have the form of the general wave equation for waves propagating with speed  where  is a function of time and location, which gives the amplitude of the wave at some time at a certain location:

This is also written as: 
where  denotes the so-called d'Alembert operator, which in Cartesian coordinates is given as:

Comparing the terms for the speed of propagation, yields in the case of the electric and magnetic fields:

This is the speed of light in vacuum. Thus Maxwell's equations connect the vacuum permittivity , the vacuum permeability , and the speed of light, c0, via the above equation. This relationship had been discovered by Wilhelm Eduard Weber and Rudolf Kohlrausch prior to the development of Maxwell's electrodynamics, however Maxwell was the first to produce a field theory consistent with waves traveling at the speed of light.

These are only two equations versus the original four, so more information pertains to these waves hidden within Maxwell's equations. A generic vector wave for the electric field has the form

In other words,

for a generic wave traveling in the  direction.

From the first of Maxwell's equations, we get

Thus,

which implies that the electric field is orthogonal to the direction the wave propagates. The second of Maxwell's equations yields the magnetic field, namely,

Thus,

The electric and magnetic field waves in the far-field travel at the speed of light. They have a special restricted orientation and proportional magnitudes, which can be seen immediately from the Poynting vector. Also, E and B far-fields in free space, which as wave solutions depend primarily on these two Maxwell equations, are in-phase with each other. This is guaranteed since the generic wave solution is first order in both space and time, and the curl operator on one side of these equations results in first-order spatial derivatives of the wave solution, while the time-derivative on the other side of the equations, which gives the other field, is first-order in time, resulting in the same phase shift for both fields in each mathematical operation.

From the viewpoint of an electromagnetic wave traveling forward, the electric field might be oscillating up and down, while the magnetic field oscillates right and left. This picture can be rotated with the electric field oscillating right and left and the magnetic field oscillating down and up. This is a different solution that is traveling in the same direction. This arbitrariness in the orientation with respect to propagation direction is known as polarization. On a quantum level, it is described as photon polarization. The direction of the polarization is defined as the direction of the electric field.

More general forms of the second-order wave equations given above are available, allowing for both non-vacuum propagation media and sources. Many competing derivations exist, all with varying levels of approximation and intended applications. One very general example is a form of the electric field equation, which was factorized into a pair of explicitly directional wave equations, and then efficiently reduced into a single uni-directional wave equation by means of a simple slow-evolution approximation.

See also 

 Antenna measurement
 Bioelectromagnetics
 Bolometer
 CONELRAD
 Electromagnetic pulse
 Electromagnetic radiation and health
 Evanescent wave coupling
 Finite-difference time-domain method
 Gravitational wave
 Helicon
 Impedance of free space
 Radiation reaction
 Health effects of sunlight exposure
 Sinusoidal plane-wave solutions of the electromagnetic wave equation

References

Further reading

External links 

 The Feynman Lectures on Physics Vol. I Ch. 28: Electromagnetic Radiation
 
 Electromagnetic Waves from Maxwell's Equations on Project PHYSNET.
 "Electromagnetic radiation" in the Encyclopædia Britannica

 
Heinrich Hertz
Radiation